The 2022 AFC Cup Final was the final match of the 2022 AFC Cup, the 19th edition of the AFC Cup, Asia's secondary club football tournament organized by the Asian Football Confederation (AFC).

The final was contested as a single match between Kuala Lumpur City from Malaysia and Al-Seeb from Oman. The match was played in Kuala Lumpur, Malaysia on 22 October 2022.

Teams

Venue 
Bukit Jalil National Stadium in Kuala Lumpur, Malaysia hosted the match.

Road to the final 

Note: In all results below, the score of the finalist is given first (H: home; A: away).

Format 
The final was played as a single leg, with the host team (winners of the Inter-zone play-off final) alternated from the previous season's final.

If the game would be tied after regulation time, the winning team would be decided by extra time and, if necessary, a penalty shoot-out.

Match

Details

Statistics

References

External links 
, the-AFC.com

AFC Cup finals
Final
October 2022 sports events in Malaysia
International club association football competitions hosted by Malaysia